ISO/IEC 8859-13:1998, Information technology — 8-bit single-byte coded graphic character sets — Part 13: Latin alphabet No. 7, is part of the ISO/IEC 8859 series of ASCII-based standard character encodings, first edition published in 1998. It is informally referred to as Latin-7 or Baltic Rim. It was designed to cover the Baltic languages, and added characters used in Polish missing from the earlier encodings ISO 8859-4 and ISO 8859-10. Unlike these two, it does not cover the Nordic languages. It is similar to the earlier-published Windows-1257; its encoding of the Estonian alphabet also matches IBM-922.

ISO-8859-13 is the IANA preferred charset name for this standard when supplemented with the C0 and C1 control codes from ISO/IEC 6429.

Microsoft has assigned code page 28603 a.k.a. Windows-28603 to ISO-8859-13. IBM has assigned Code page 921 to ISO-8859-13. ISO-IR 206 replaces the currency sign at position A4 with the euro sign (€).

Codepage layout
Differences from ISO-8859-1 have the Unicode code point number below the character.

References

External links
ISO/IEC 8859-13:1998
ISO/IEC 8859-13:1998 - 8-bit single-byte coded graphic character sets, Part 13: Latin alphabet No. 7 (draft dated April 15, 1998, published October 15, 1998)
ISO-IR 179 Baltic Rim Supplementary Set (April 1, 1993)

ISO/IEC 8859
Computer-related introductions in 1998